The 1999–2000 NBA season was the Grizzlies' 5th season in the National Basketball Association. After finishing the lockout season with the worst record, the Grizzlies received the second overall pick in the 1999 NBA draft, and selected Steve Francis from the University of Maryland. However, Francis refused to play for the Canadian team, and was later on traded to the Houston Rockets in exchange for second-year guard Michael Dickerson, Othella Harrington, Brent Price and Antoine Carr; Dickerson would reunite with his former University of Arizona teammate, second-year star Mike Bibby. Francis, now with the Rockets, would be named Rookie of the Year along with Elton Brand of the Chicago Bulls. During the off-season, the Grizzlies signed free agents Grant Long, and three-point specialist Dennis Scott.

After a 3–3 start to the season, the team still struggled posting an 11-game losing streak, as head coach Brian Hill was fired after a 4–18 start, and was replaced with assistant Lionel Hollins. The Grizzlies went on a 12–game losing streak between February and March, losing 14 of their 15 games in March, and finishing last place in the Midwest Division with a 22–60 record, which was the first time the franchise had won 20 or more games in a full season.

Shareef Abdur-Rahim averaged 20.3 points and 10.1 rebounds per game, while Dickerson averaged 18.2 points and 1.4 steals per game, and Bibby provided the team with 14.5 points, 8.1 assists and 1.6 steals per game. In addition, Harrington contributed 13.1 points and 6.9 rebounds per game, and Bryant Reeves provided with 8.9 points and 5.7 rebounds per game. Off the bench, Scott contributed 5.6 points per game, while Long provided with 4.8 points and 5.6 rebounds per game, but only played just 42 games due to a hand injury. 

Following the season, Scott was traded along with second-year guard Felipe López, and Cherokee Parks to the Washington Wizards, but was released to free agency, while Carr retired, and Hollins was fired as head coach.

Offseason

Draft

The Grizzlies originally had three picks entering the Draft. Steve Francis was the 2nd overall pick in the 1999 NBA draft from the University of Maryland. Francis most notably cried after being chosen by Vancouver, swearing the Chicago Bulls would regret selecting Elton Brand first overall instead. Following Vancouver's draft, Francis publicly announced that he did not want to play for the Grizzlies, citing the distance from his Maryland home, taxes, endorsements, and God's will. Francis was heavily criticized for his antics, especially in Vancouver. Following his public outburst, Francis was traded to the Houston Rockets that summer in a three-team, 11-player deal that brought Michael Dickerson, Othella Harrington, Antoine Carr, Brent Price, plus first- and second-round picks to the Grizzlies. He and Brand shared Rookie of the Year honors.

Obinna Ekezie from the University of Maryland was their second pick. Their final pick in the draft was Antwain Smith from the Saint Paul's College.

Roster

Roster notes
Rookie point guard Milt Palacio also holds American citizenship.

Regular season

Season standings

Record vs. opponents

Game log

Player statistics

Season

Awards and records

Transactions

References

 Grizzlies on Database Basketball
 Grizzlies on Basketball Reference

Vancouver Grizzlies seasons
Vancouver
Van